Flight 165 may refer to:

LOT Polish Airlines Flight 165, crashed on 2 April 1969
Helikopter Service Flight 165, crashed on 26 June 1978
LOT Polish Airlines Flight 165 hijacking, on 30 August 1978

0165